Pwintbyu is the principal town of Pwintbyu Township in Minbu District in Magway Region of Myanmar.

Populated places in Magway Region